The  was a Japanese fleet oiler (hybrid tanker/carrier) of the Imperial Japanese Navy (IJN), serving during World War II.

Construction
Hayasui was completed as one of the Kazahaya class fleet oilers. After lack of reconnaissance planes was identified as a contributing factor to defeat of the IJN at the Battle of Midway, aviation facilities were added to Hayasui for accompanying the carrier task force.  The IJN added the function of food supply ship to Hayasui to improve carrier task force endurance following experience at the Battle of the Santa Cruz Islands.

Service
24 April 1944 : Completed.
May 1944 : Sailed to Tawi-Tawi for Operation A.
5 May 1944 : Collided with submerged submarine I-155.
19 to 20 June 1944 : Participation to the Battle of the Philippine Sea and damaged.
10 August 1944 : Repairs were completed for convoy Hi-71 departure from Moji to Singapore.

Fate
03:20, 19 August 1944 : Hayasui was torpedoed (2 hits) by USS Bluefish at west of Vigan City.
10 October 1944 : Decommissioned.

References

Footnotes

Bibliography
, History of Pacific War Vol.62 "Ships of The Imperial Japanese Forces, Gakken (Japan), January 2008, 
Ships of the World special issue Vol.47, Auxiliary Vessels of the Imperial Japanese Navy, (Japan), March 1997

World War II naval ships of Japan
Auxiliary ships of the Imperial Japanese Navy
World War II tankers
Escort carriers of the Imperial Japanese Navy
Ships sunk by American submarines
1943 ships
Oilers
Maritime incidents in May 1944
Maritime incidents in August 1944
World War II shipwrecks in the South China Sea
Ships built by IHI Corporation